Welcome Back Gandhi (also known as Mudhalvar Mahatma) is a 2012 Indian film directed by A. Balakrishnan.  The film, released on 30 January 2012 in India, stars S. Kanagaraj as Mohandas Gandhi. The movie's music was written by Ilaiyaraaja, with lyrics by Bharat Acharya, and the movie's plot explores how Gandhi might react if he was still alive and visited modern day India. An eight-song soundtrack is set to be released shortly after the film's debut.

Filming for Welcome Back Gandhi took place over a 40-day period in Chennai during 2012, and was produced on a budget of ₹3 crore.

Plot 

After a 60-year absence, Gandhi (S. Kanagaraj) returns to India to resume his Satyagraha Movement. While there, he must deal with the various social, economical and political issues that exist within the country.

Cast 

S. Kanagaraj as Mahatma Gandhi
Anupam Kher as the Chief Minister of a State in India
Manvi Gagroo
V. S. Raghavan
Satyendra
Deenadhayalan
Krishnammal Jagannathan

Reception 

The Hindu gave a positive review for Welcome Back Gandhi, commenting that "It's a noble, valiant effort that needs to be seen and promoted just so that another filmmaker is encouraged to invest in a film as honest as this, one that will invoke and appeal to the patriot in you, despite its idealistic failings."

See also
List of artistic depictions of Mahatma Gandhi

References

External links 
 

Films about Mahatma Gandhi
2012 films
2010s Tamil-language films
Films scored by Ilaiyaraaja
2012 multilingual films
Indian multilingual films